José García Pérez (26 January 1936 – 19 June 2022) was a Spanish politician.

A member of the Union of the Democratic Centre and the Andalusian Party, he served in the Congress of Deputies from 1977 to 1982.

García died of cancer in Málaga on 19 June 2022.

References

1936 births
2022 deaths
Politicians from Melilla
Union of the Democratic Centre (Spain) politicians
Members of the Congress of Deputies (Spain)
Members of the constituent Congress of Deputies (Spain)
Members of the 1st Congress of Deputies (Spain)